Alan Carr's Celebrity Ding Dong is a game show on Channel 4, presented by Alan Carr. During the first series, voice-over commentary in between rounds on the scores is provided by Leslie Phillips.  From Series 2, the announcer is Peter Dickson. A Series 1 compilation was later released onto DVD in 2008.

Format
The first series of Alan Carr's Celebrity Ding Dong was based around a gameshow format where two teams — "Celebrities" and "Civilians" — were asked a series of questions relating to the other team's lifestyle. Rounds included 'Celebrity Crypts', 'Life Swap', 'Kiss and Tell' and 'How the Other Half Lives'; producers claim that "fantastic prizes" can be won, much like a traditional gameshow format.

The second series abandoned the "Celebrities vs. Civilians" angle and went with two different teams of celebrities each episode.

The show also includes a celebrity news section, where Carr will irreverently discuss the week's showbiz news.

Episodes

Series 1

Series 2
Series 2 started 10 October 2008. Although the series was originally commissioned for 6 episodes, only 5 episodes aired. However, at the end of the series, Alan revealed that there would be a special episode airing at Christmas time. The shows  featured two teams of celebrities from similar programs or who have similar  backgrounds playing against each other, such as Coronation Street vs EastEnders. Alan Carr noted in an interview with Jonathan Ross, that due to complaints from civilians they had to abandon the previous format and go along with celebrity teams.

 The winning celebrity team

Home release
Season one was released onto DVD 20 October 2008. It features the entire 6-episode season meshed together with intercepting scenes of him interviewing Liz Hurley. Bonus features involve the unaired pilot, deleted scenes, a gag reel and a featurette. It featured only English subtitles and is only playable on a Region 2 player.

Season Two has not been released and no statements for its release have been made, most probably due to Carr' moving on with his chat show and the fact the series had low viewers towards its end.

References

External links

2000s British game shows
2008 British television series debuts
2008 British television series endings
Channel 4 game shows